Club Deportivo San Roque de Lepe, SAD is a Spanish football team based in Lepe, in the autonomous community of Andalusia. Founded in 1956 it plays in Segunda División RFEF – Group 4, holding home games at Estadio Ciudad de Lepe, with a capacity of 3,512 seats.

Season to season

9 seasons in Segunda División B
1 season in Segunda División RFEF
19 seasons in Tercera División

Current squad

References

External links
Official website 
Futbolme team profile 

Football clubs in Andalusia
Association football clubs established in 1956
1956 establishments in Spain
Province of Huelva